Olga Cristea (born 13 December 1987) is a Moldovan runner who specializes in the 800 metres. Her personal best time is 2:00.12 minutes, achieved at the 2008 Olympic Games in Beijing.

She was born in Chişinău. She won the silver medal at the 2003 World Youth Championships and the gold medal at the 2006 World Junior Championships. She also competed at the Olympic Games in 2004 and 2008, but without reaching the final. She ran at the 2009 World Championships in Athletics, but did not make it past the heats.

She received a two-year ban from the sport in July 2010 after testing positive for abnormal levels of testosterone.

Achievements

See also
List of doping cases in athletics

References

1987 births
Living people
Moldovan female middle-distance runners
Athletes (track and field) at the 2004 Summer Olympics
Athletes (track and field) at the 2008 Summer Olympics
Olympic athletes of Moldova
Sportspeople from Chișinău
Doping cases in athletics
Universiade medalists in athletics (track and field)
Universiade silver medalists for Moldova
Medalists at the 2009 Summer Universiade